Oak Grove is an unincorporated community in Sumter County, Florida, United States.  The ZIP code for this community is 33597, which is shared by Webster to the west.

Notes

Unincorporated communities in Sumter County, Florida
Unincorporated communities in Florida